The Calistoga AVA is an American Viticultural Area located in the northern portion of California's Napa Valley AVA.

Geography and Climate
Despite sharing a name, the Calistoga AVA does not encompass the entirety of the town of Calistoga. The area is noted for its topographical diversity and uniform geology, with bedrock almost exclusively made through volcanic action. The hot days provide color and flavor in the wines, while the cool nights help to maintain acidity and structure

The appellation abuts the Diamond Mountain District AVA to the south and west, the Saint Helena AVA to the southeast, and the Howell Mountain AVA is a short way to the east.

History
The name Calistoga dates back to 1857, with the first vine plantings in 1862. Viticultural and winery census data from 1880 list Calistoga as a distinct region separate from Napa. The appellation was proposed in 2003 by Bo Barrett petitioning for separate AVA status, with final approval coming through in 2009, effective 2010.

Controversy
When the appellation was proposed, two wineries (Calistoga Cellars and Calistoga Estate) fought against the proposal, as under U.S. wine law they would either have to use 85% grapes from the new AVA (neither did at the time) or change their brand names. Several compromises were proposed, and ultimately rejected, before the AVA was approved. During the process, the Tax and Trade Bureau, the federal body in charge of AVA designations, paused the process of all AVA proposals due to the need to redefine regulations.

Ultimately, the wineries using the Calistoga name were given three years to come in compliance with the appellation rules or discontinue using the name.

See also 

 California wine
 Geography of California
 Napa Valley Wine Train

References

American Viticultural Areas of the San Francisco Bay Area
Napa Valley
Geography of Napa County, California
2010 establishments in California
American Viticultural Areas